Antonio Ruiz de Montoya University (Universidad Antonio Ruiz de Montoya – UARM) is a private, non-profit university located in the city of Lima, Peru, in the district of Pueblo Libre. It was founded by the Society of Jesus on 4 July 2003. It incorporated the School of Pedagogy, Philosophy, and Literature Antonio Ruiz de Montoya which had been founded in 1991.

Since 2011 UARM has ranked among the top 20 universities in Peru according to the prestigious pollster America Economy, and was ranked 12th in 2015.

Academics
Antonio Ruiz de Montoya University offers the following programs of undergraduate and graduate study:

Faculty of Humanities
 Secondary Education majoring in philosophy and historical social sciences
 Primary school majoring in language and literature
 Philosophy
 Psychology
 Journalism

Faculty of Social Sciences
 Sustainable tourism
 Political science
 Law
 Economy majoring in public and environmental management.

School of Engineering and Management
 Administration
 Industrial engineering

See also
 Education in Peru
 List of Jesuit sites
 List of universities in Peru

References

External links
 Publications

Jesuit universities and colleges
Educational institutions established in 2003
2003 establishments in Peru